"Down to My Last Teardrop" is a song written by Paul Davis, and recorded by American country music artist Tanya Tucker.  It was released in June 1991 as the first single from Tucker's album What Do I Do with Me.  The song reached number 2 on the Billboard Hot Country Singles & Tracks chart in September 1991, behind Brooks & Dunn's "Brand New Man" and number 1 on the RPM Country Tracks chart in Canada.

Chart performance

Year-end charts

References

1991 singles
Tanya Tucker songs
Songs written by Paul Davis (singer)
Capitol Records Nashville singles
Song recordings produced by Jerry Crutchfield
1991 songs